Michael Thompson (born June 28, 1956) is an American sports shooter. He competed in the mixed skeet event at the 1984 Summer Olympics.

References

External links
 

1956 births
Living people
American male sport shooters
Olympic shooters of the United States
Shooters at the 1984 Summer Olympics
Sportspeople from Hampton, Virginia
Pan American Games medalists in shooting
Pan American Games gold medalists for the United States
Shooters at the 1983 Pan American Games
20th-century American people
21st-century American people